Khald Youssef Shurrab (Arabic:خالد يوسف شراب) (born 12 September 1999) is a Qatari footballer who plays as winger for Al-Wakrah.

References

External links
 

Qatari footballers
1999 births
Living people
El Jaish SC players
Al-Duhail SC players
Al-Khor SC players
Al-Wakrah SC players
Qatar Stars League players
Association football wingers